Stets is a Ukrainian surname, literally meaning a diminutive of the given name Stepan. Notable people with the surname include:

 Marina Stets (born 1973), Belarusian tennis player
 Yuriy Stets (born 1975), Ukrainian journalist and politician